Doc at the Radar Station is the eleventh studio album by American band Captain Beefheart and the Magic Band, released in August 1980 by Virgin Records.

Packaging
The album cover was painted by Don Van Vliet. It was placed at number forty-nine on Rolling Stone's 100 Greatest Album Covers.

Background
Although about half of the album's songs are based on old musical ideas, Mike Barnes states that "most of the revamping work built on skeletal ideas and fragments ... would have mouldered away in the vaults had they not been exhumed and transformed into full-blown, totally convincing new material". The tracks "A Carrot is as Close as a Rabbit Gets to a Diamond", "Flavor Bud Living" and "Brickbats" were originally intended and recorded for the proposed album Bat Chain Puller but it wasn't released due to Frank Zappa owning the master tapes as DiscReet cofounders Herb Cohen and Zappa feuded over the production of the album, because Cohen funded the production with Zappa's royalty checks.

John French rejoins the Magic Band for this album. He plays guitar on all songs, plus bass guitar on "Sheriff of Hong Kong", and drums on the tracks "Ashtray Heart" and "Sheriff of Hong Kong" and marimba on "Making Love To A Vampire With A Monkey On My Knee". He also sings the second vocal on "Dirty Blue Gene".

Reissues
In 2011, 4 Men with Beards released a 180-gram version of the album, distributed by City Hall Records.

Track listing

Personnel
Captain Beefheart (Don Van Vliet) – vocals, Chinese gongs, harmonica, soprano saxophone, bass clarinet
John French – slide guitar, guitar, bass, drums (on "Ashtray Heart" and "Sheriff of Hong Kong"), marimba (on "Making Love To A Vampire With A Monkey On My Knee"), vocals on "Dirty Blue Gene" and "Run Paint Run Run"
Jeff Moris Tepper – slide guitar, guitar, nerve guitar, background vocals on "Run Paint Run Run"
Eric Drew Feldman – synthesizer, bass, mellotron, grand piano, electric piano, background vocals on "Run Paint Run Run"
Robert Arthur Williams – drums, background vocals on "Run Paint Run Run"

Additional personnel
Gary Lucas – guitar (on "Flavor Bud Living"), French horn (on "Best Batch Yet")
Bruce Lambourne Fowler – trombone (on "Run Paint Run Run")

Notes

External links
Lyrics, reviews and details at the Captain Beefheart Radar Station

1980 albums
Captain Beefheart albums
Virgin Records albums